Ashfaq is a given name for boys, meaning noble prince. Notable people with the name include:


Given name
Ashfaq Afridi (born 1987), Pakistani cricketer
Ashfaq Ahmed (disambiguation), multiple people
Ashfaq Hussain, PP, (born 1951), modern Urdu poet
Ashfaq Parvez Kayani, NI(M), HI (born 1952), current Chief of Army Staff of the Pakistan Army
Ashfaq Munshi, entrepreneur and technology executive
Ashfaq Majeed Wani (1966–1990), Jammu Kashmir Liberation Front militant

Surname
Ali Ashfaq (born 1985), Maldivian footballer nicknamed "Dhagandey"
Basit Ashfaq, (born 1986), professional squash player who represented Pakistan

See also
Ashfaq Bhatti, Urdu-English slasher film directed by Omar Khan

References

de:Ashfaq